Zheng Zhijie (born May 1958) is a Chinese politician and economist currently serving as governor of China Development Bank.

Biography
Born in May 1958, Zheng graduated from Dongbei University of Finance and Economics in 1982.

After graduation, he was assigned to the China Construction Bank. He served as vice-governor of China Construction Bank's Beijing Branch from 1992 to 1997 and governor of Beijing Branch from 1997 to 2001. In 2001 he was promoted to become vice-governor of China Construction Bank and CEO of the China Jianyin Investment Ltd., and held that offices until 2008. In December 2008, he was appointed vice-governor of China Development Bank, he remained in that position until October 2012, when he was promoted again to become its governor.

On November 22, 2016, Zheng was hired as a part-time professor at Nankai University.

References

External links

1958 births
Living people
People's Republic of China economists
Dongbei University of Finance and Economics alumni
Chinese Communist Party politicians
Politicians of the People's Republic of China